Ann or Anne Williams may refer to:

 Ann Williams (actress) (1935–1985), American actress
 Ann Williams (choreographer) (born 1937), American dancer and founder of the Dallas Black Dance Theater
 Ann Williams (historian) (born 1937), British historian
 Ann Claire Williams (born 1949), American federal judge
 Anne Williams (activist) (1951–2013), British campaigner
 Ann Williams (athlete) (born 1965), British middle-distance runner
 Ann Williams (politician) (born 1968), member of Illinois House of Representatives
 Anne Williams Wheaton (died 1977), American publicist
 Ann Williams, character in The Satan Bug

See also
Anna Williams (disambiguation)